Van Phuc may refer to:

 Vạn Phúc, Hà Đông, a ward of Hà Đông District, near Hanoi, known for silk weaving 
 , a rural commune of Thanh Trì District, Hanoi
 , a rural commune of Ninh Giang District

People with the given name
 Hoàng Văn Phúc (born 1964), Vietnamese football manager
 Nguyễn Văn Phúc (born 1981), Vietnamese powerlifter